The Société littéraire des Goncourt (Goncourt Literary Society), usually called the Académie Goncourt (Goncourt Academy), is a French literary organisation based in Paris. It was founded in 1900 by the French writer and publisher Edmond de Goncourt (1822–1896), who wanted to create a new way to encourage literature in France and disagreed with the contemporary policies of the Académie Française.

Formation and organization
Wishing to honor his deceased brother Jules (1830–1870), Goncourt  bequeathed his estate to establish an organization to promote literature in France. He named his friend, the writer Alphonse Daudet, along with Léon Hennique, to oversee and administer his estate. The society was to consist of ten members, of whom eight were nominated in the will. Each of the members was to receive an annuity of 6,000 francs, and a yearly prize of 5,000 francs was to be awarded to the author of some work of fiction. After some litigation, the academy was constituted in 1903. Since then, each December, a ten-member board of the Académie has awarded the Prix Goncourt for the best work of fiction of the year.

Membership is reserved to writers who have produced works in the French language, but it is not limited to citizens of France. In 1996, the Spanish novelist and scriptwriter Jorge Semprún was elected as the first foreigner to become a member of the academy.

In addition to the Prix Goncourt, which comes with a symbolic cheque of 10 euros, the Académie Goncourt awards honors for first novel and achievements in short story, poetry and biography genres.

The ten members of the academy are usually called les Dix (the Ten).  They meet the first Tuesday of each month, except in summer. Since 1914, they have convened in an oval room, the salon Goncourt, on the second floor of the Restaurant Drouant, place Gaillon, in the heart of Paris.  The cutlery  which they use while dining there constitutes the main physical continuity of the academy.  Each new member receives the fork and knife of the member whom he (or she) is replacing, and the member's name is engraved on the knife and the fork.

Current members

As of 2020, the members of the Académie Goncourt are:
 Didier Decoin, elected 1995; President
 Françoise Chandernagor, elected 1995; Vice President
 Tahar Ben Jelloun, elected 2008
 Patrick Rambaud, elected 2008
 Philippe Claudel, elected 2012; Secretary General
 Pierre Assouline, elected 2012
 Paule Constant, elected 2013
 Éric-Emmanuel Schmitt, elected 2016
 Pascal Bruckner, elected 2020
 Camille Laurens, elected 2020

Academicians by seat

1st Seat
 1900–1942 : Léon Daudet
 1942–1944 : Jean de La Varende
 1944–1954 : Colette
 1954–1970 : Jean Giono
 1971–1977 : Bernard Clavel
 1977–2004 : André Stil
 2004–2019 : Bernard Pivot
 2020–present : Pascal Bruckner

2nd Seat
 1900–1907 : Joris-Karl Huysmans
 1907–1910 : Jules Renard
 1910–1917 : Judith Gautier
 1918–1924 : Henry Céard
 1924–1939 : Pol Neveux
 1939–1948 : Sacha Guitry
 1949–1983 : Armand Salacrou
 1983–2016 : Edmonde Charles-Roux
 2016–present : Éric-Emmanuel Schmitt

3rd Seat
 1900–1917 : Octave Mirbeau
 1917–1947 : Jean Ajalbert
 1947–1973 : Alexandre Arnoux
 1973–1995 : Jean Cayrol
 1995–present : Didier Decoin

4th Seat
 1900–1940 : J.-H. Rosny aîné
 1940–1942 : Pierre Champion
 1943–1971 : André Billy
 1971–2012 : Robert Sabatier
 2013–present : Paule Constant

5th Seat
 1900–1948 : J.-H. Rosny jeune
 1948–1967 : Gérard Bauër
 1967–1968 : Louis Aragon
 1969–1983 : Armand Lanoux
 1983–2008 : Daniel Boulanger
 2008–present : Patrick Rambaud

6th Seat
 1900–1935 : Léon Hennique
 1936–1950 : Léo Larguier
 1951–1977 : Raymond Queneau
 1977–2008 : François Nourissier
 2006–present : Tahar Ben Jelloun

7th Seat
 1900–1918 : Paul Margueritte
 1919–1923 : Émile Bergerat
 1924–1937 : Raoul Ponchon
 1938–1948 : René Benjamin
 1949–1971 : Philippe Hériat
 1972–2011 : Michel Tournier
 2011–2015 : Régis Debray
 2016–2020 : Virginie Despentes
 2020–present : Camille Laurens

8th Seat
 1900–1926 : Gustave Geffroy
 1926–1929 : Georges Courteline
 1929–1973 : Roland Dorgelès
 1973–1995 : Emmanuel Roblès
 1995–present : Françoise Chandernagor

9th Seat
 1900–1925 : Élémir Bourges
 1926–1937 : Gaston Chérau
 1937–1958 : Francis Carco
 1958–1996 : Hervé Bazin
 1996–2011 : Jorge Semprún
 2012–present : Philippe Claudel

10th Seat
 1900–1949 : Lucien Descaves
 1950–1970 : Pierre Mac Orlan
 1970–2011 : Françoise Mallet-Joris
 2012–present : Pierre Assouline

Notes

French writers' organizations
Organizations established in 1900
1900 establishments in France
Arts organizations established in 1903